Skull Rock may refer to:
A rock formation located in Joshua Tree National Park
Skull Rock Pass in the House Range of Utah
Cleft Island (Victoria), Australia
A fictional place on the show The Berenstain Bears
A fictional place in the 1953 film Peter Pan